The list of urban centers in Istanbul lists the major clusters of retail, office, government, retail and dense residential buildings within the city limits of Istanbul, including areas of the historic city center, Fatih, as well as edge cities built outside the historic core.

Important "edge cities", i.e. corridors and nodes of business and shopping centers and of tall residential buildings, include the Istanbul Central Business District in and around Şisli; the E-5/D-100 highway corridor along the north side of the old airport, and on the Asian side, Kozyatağı–Ataşehir, Altunizade, Kavacik and Ümraniye.

European side

Historic city center areas

Fatih
Eminönü
The Grand Bazaar
The Spice Bazaar
Sultanahmet
Yedikule

Beyoğlu district (historic Pera)

Cihangir
Galata
İstiklal Avenue
Karaköy
Taksim Square

Istanbul Central Business District
Büyükdere Avenue runs through Beşiktaş, Şişli and Sarıyer districts, lined with residential and office towers and shopping complexes

Beşiktaş district

Arnavutköy
Balmumcu
Bebek
Gayrettepe incl. Profilo, Astoria and Trump complexes
Ortaköy

Sarıyer district
Emirgan
Tarabya 
Yeniköy

Şişli district

Bomonti/Şişli Merkez (original center of Şişli)
Esentepe including Zincirlikuyu and the Zorlu Center 
Fulya
Levent including the Metrocity, Kanyon, Özdilekpark and Istanbul Sapphire complexes
Nişantaşı
Otim
Zorlu Center

Other areas on the European side

Bakırköy district
Ataköy
E-5/D-100 highway corridor along the north side of the old airport
Yeşilköy (San Stefano)

Bahçelievler district
Bahçelievler
E-5/D-100 highway corridor along the north side of the old airport

Esenler district
Giyimkent ("Clothing City")
Tekstilkent ("Textile City")

Eyüp district
Eyüp

Asian side

Ataşehir district 
Ataşehir

Beykoz district 
Kanlıca

Kadıköy district 
Kozyatağı
Bağdat Avenue

Maltepe district 
Bağdat Avenue

Ümraniye district 
Ümraniye

Üsküdar district 
Altunizade
Beylerbeyi
Çengelköy
Kandilli

Related lists
List of museums and monuments in Istanbul
List of universities in Istanbul
List of schools in Istanbul
List of architectural structures in Istanbul
List of columns and towers in Istanbul
List of libraries in Istanbul
List of mayors of Istanbul
List of Istanbulites

References 

Geography of Istanbul
Istanbul-related lists
Istanbul